Leon Bürger (born 11 November 1999) is a German footballer who plays as a midfielder for Babelsberg 03 on loan from SC Verl.

Club career
On 31 January 2023, Bürger joined Babelsberg 03 in Regionalliga on loan.

Personal life
Bürger is the son of former footballer and manager Henning Bürger.

References

External links
 
 

1999 births
Living people
German footballers
Germany youth international footballers
Association football midfielders
Eintracht Braunschweig II players
Eintracht Braunschweig players
FC Carl Zeiss Jena players
SC Verl players
SV Babelsberg 03 players
2. Bundesliga players
3. Liga players
Regionalliga players